The DeGray Creek Bridge is a historic bridge in rural Clark County, Arkansas. It carries County Road 50 (Blish Road) over DeGray Creek, west of the county seat Arkadelphia. Its trusses were purchased by the county from the Hope Bridge Company and the Stupp Brothers Bridge and Iron Works in 1915. They were moved to the present bridge circa 1970, when the original location was slated to be flooded by the construction of DeGray Dam.

The bridge was listed on the National Register of Historic Places in 2010.

See also
List of bridges documented by the Historic American Engineering Record in Arkansas
List of bridges on the National Register of Historic Places in Arkansas
National Register of Historic Places listings in Clark County, Arkansas

References

External links

Historic American Engineering Record in Arkansas
Road bridges on the National Register of Historic Places in Arkansas
Bridges completed in 1915
National Register of Historic Places in Clark County, Arkansas
Pratt truss bridges in the United States
Transportation in Clark County, Arkansas
1915 establishments in Arkansas
Relocated buildings and structures in Arkansas